SRC Holdings Corp (SRC) is an American equipment company based in Springfield, Missouri.

History
SRC was established in 1983 when 13 employees of International Harvester purchased a part of that company that rebuilt truck engines, with $100,000 of their own money and $8.9 million in loans, with the goal of saving 119 jobs.  By 1988, SRC's debt to equity ratio was down to 1.8 to 1, and the business had a value of $43 million. The stock price, $0.10 in 1983, had increased to $13 per share.  By 2015, the stock was worth over $199 per share.

SRC founded and invested in more than 60 separate companies that do everything from consulting to packaging to building high-performance engines.  Including current joint-ventures SRC's sales are over $600M, with more than 2,000 employees, and has  of manufacturing and warehousing space.

Books
President and CEO Jack Stack has written two books (with Bo Burlingham), The Great Game of Business and A Stake in the Outcome, detailing the business and management techniques practiced and promoted by the company. The Great Game of Business has had 25 printings, has sold over 350,000 copies in 14 languages, and has been cited in over 100 business books. Jack Stack has written a third book in 2020 with Darren Dahl, Change the Game: Saving the American Dream by Closing the Gap Between the Haves and the Have-Nots.

Award 
The 2019 Txemi Cantera International Social Economy Prize was awarded by ASLE to SRC and its President, Jack Stack.

Further reading 
Stack, Jack and Bo Burlingham (2002). A Stake in the Outcome, Random House, Inc.
Stack, Jack with Bo Burlingham (1992, 2013).  The Great Game of Business, Crown Business, a Division of Random House, Inc
Stack, Jack with Darren Dahl (2020). "Change the Game: Saving the American Dream by Closing the Gap Between the Haves and the Have-Nots", Advantage Media Group

References

External links 
Company website

Companies based in Springfield, Missouri